José Godofredo de Moura Rangel is a Brazilian writer, who was born in Três Corações city, state of Minas Gerais, in 1884. He was friend of Monteiro Lobato. Godofredo Rangel was a regionalist writer who wrote about culture and history of Minas Gerais, his native land. He died in 1951.

Bibliography 
 Falange Gloriosa, 1917
 Vida Ociosa, 1920 - Main work.
 Andorinhas, 1921
 A Filha, 1929
 Os Humildes, 1944
 Os Bem Casados, ?

1864 births
1951 deaths
20th-century Brazilian male writers
20th-century Brazilian novelists
Brazilian male novelists